The Masonic Temple Building was a skyscraper built in Chicago, Illinois in 1892, and from 1895 to the 1920s the tallest building in Chicago.

History 
Designed by the firm of Burnham and Root and built at the corner of Randolph and State Streets, the building rose 21 stories.  When the clock tower was removed from the 1885 Board of Trade Building in 1895, the Masonic Temple became the tallest in the city. The building was owned by Oriental Lodge #33 which still meets to this day. 

The building featured a central court ringed by nine floors of shops with offices above and meeting rooms for the Masons at the very top. These meeting rooms also served as theaters, which contributed to the building's obsolescence; its elevators proved inadequate for these crowds, and the building rapidly fell from favor with commercial tenants.

Chicago's building height regulations enacted in 1892 (the year the Temple was built), didn't allow taller buildings, until that was amended in the 1920s. In 1939 the Masonic Temple was demolished, in part due to its poor internal services, but also due to the construction of the new State Street subway, which would have necessitated expensive foundation retrofitting. Also, in 1926 the New Masonic Building had opened nearby. A two-story "taxpayer" housing a Walgreens drug store was erected in its place, and the Joffrey Tower currently stands on the former site of this building.

Both the building's primary designer, John Wellborn Root, and the Masons' primary representative, Norman Gassette, died of natural causes during its construction.

Gallery

See also
Early skyscrapers
List of tallest buildings in Chicago
Oriental Lodge #33 Ancient Free and Accepted Masons Chicago, IL

References

External links

World's Tallest Skyscrapers
A City Under One Roof—The Masonic Temple, Chicago – Scientific American, February 10, 1894.

Skyscraper office buildings in Chicago
Burnham and Root buildings
Former Masonic buildings in Illinois
Former skyscrapers
Former buildings and structures in Chicago
Masonic buildings completed in 1892
Buildings and structures demolished in 1939
1939 disestablishments in Illinois
Demolished buildings and structures in Chicago
Chicago school architecture in Illinois
1892 establishments in Illinois